Virgilio was the first Web portal in Italy. Born in 1996 as a search engine and Web directory manually edited by its own editors (Yahoo! model), has gradually evolved as a general portal with different contents, offering users Webmail services, a search engine, chats and a Web community.

The editorial style of the early days still leaves an imprint on Virgilio, strongly oriented into providing quality news contents, organized into premium vertical channels. Local contents also have a great relevance, with over 8,100 portals, one for each Italian town.

It all adds up making Virgilio a reference point for the Italian web, as evidenced by its figures: one out of two Italian surfers visits the portal each month, a total of over 13 million users per month (source: Audiweb TDA November 2015).

External links
 

Italian websites
Web portals
Internet properties established in 1996
Webmail